Wadi-e-Hussain (The Valley of Hussain) is the largest organized  and the first online cemetery in Pakistan, located in the northern part of the coastal city of Karachi on Karachi–Hyderabad Motorway; it is connected to the city by the main highway connecting Karachi with Hyderabad. The community-run cemetery has been an inspiration for the local people in the coastal city. Apart from elders, there is a specific column/place for the children who die in their early ages. However, the cemetery has been a common burial cite for the local Shiite Muslims. The graveyard is also decorated with the special lights on special occasions such as Eid al-Fitr, Eid al-Adha, Mid-Sha'ban etc.

Services
The services offered by the Wadi-e-Hussain management are as follows:
 Ambulance Service for the transportation of the dead bodies.
 Primary arrangements for the funeral.
 Reservation of the grave at Wadi-e-Hussain Cemetery.
 Transportation of the family members and other relatives.
 Finishing of the grave with all the prescribed material.

COVID-19 
All graveyards shall remain closed on Shab-e-Barat between nights of  8/9 April, 2020  due to lock down amid COVID-19 outbreak, following the instruction, Management of the graveyard has cancelled the well known community celebration of Shab-e-Barat at Wadi-e-Hussain and advised the people to observe their Rituals individually and offer prayers by enlisting allotted number of grave at the web-site.

Blocks
There are approximately ten blocks in which the graves are divided, some of which are as follows:
 Block Hazrat Ali
 Block Hazrat Salman-e-Farsi
 Block Hazrat Imam Zain-ul-Abideen
 Block Hazrat Hurr
 Block Zaid Shaheed
 Block Awn and Muhammad

A small block is also created at the side consisting the graves of new b

Notable Burials
 Allama Dr. Syed Zameer Akhtar Naqvi – Religious Scholar                                                         
 Professor Ustad Sibte Jaafar Zaidi – Academic
 Syed Ali Aslam Jafri –  Justice of the Sindh High Court
 Social Activist Syed Khurram Zaki – Public Orator      
 Syed Jafar Hussain Abidi – Social Activist, Nazim, Historic                                                  
 Mahmood Ali – Radio/Television Artist and Stage Artist
 Khan Muttaqi Nadeem – Advocate Lawyer, Poet, Author
 Mehnaz – Radio/Television Singer
 Syed Shabbir Hussain Naqvi
 Syed Mohammad Wizarat ibn Syed Maqsood Hussain – Religious Scholar & Honest Banker
In addition to graves of different people, there are two selective points with in the graveyard where Alams are hoisted, a large number of people gather there for praying.

References

External links
 

Cemeteries in Karachi